Stizocera ichilo is a species of beetle in the family Cerambycidae. It was described by Lingafelter in 2004.

References

Stizocera
Beetles described in 2004